William Olin Burgin (July 28, 1877 – April 11, 1946) was a U.S. Representative from North Carolina.

Born on a farm near Marion, McDowell County, North Carolina, Burgin moved with his parents to Rutherfordton, North Carolina, where he attended the public schools and Rutherfordton Military Institute.
He also attended the Law School of the University of North Carolina at Chapel Hill.
He engaged as a clerk in a general store in Rutherfordton in 1893 and later as a traveling salesman and merchant.
He moved to Thomasville and engaged in the mercantile business.
He was admitted to the bar.
He served as mayor of Thomasville, North Carolina, from 1906 to 1910.
He moved to Lexington, North Carolina, and continued the practice of law.
He served as president and attorney of the Industrial Bank of Lexington.
He served as director in a number of business enterprises in Lexington.
He served in the State house of representatives in 1931.
He served as member of the State senate in 1933.

Burgin was elected as a Democrat to the Seventy-sixth and to the three succeeding Congresses and served from January 3, 1939, until his death in Washington, D.C., on April 11, 1946.
He was interred in Lexington Cemetery, Lexington, North Carolina.

A confidential 1943 analysis of the House Foreign Affairs Committee by Isaiah Berlin for the British Foreign Office described Burgin as "a meek, mild, homely figure who seldom makes his presence felt, but who has voted regularly for the President's foreign policy measures. A typical southern Democrat."

See also
 List of United States Congress members who died in office (1900–49)

References

Sources

1877 births
1946 deaths
Mayors of places in North Carolina
University of North Carolina School of Law alumni
Democratic Party members of the North Carolina House of Representatives
Democratic Party North Carolina state senators
Democratic Party members of the United States House of Representatives from North Carolina
People from Thomasville, North Carolina
Businesspeople from North Carolina
North Carolina lawyers